OTI Festival 1977 was the sixth edition of the annual OTI Festival. It took place in Madrid, Spain, following the country's victory at the 1976 contest with the song "Canta cigarra" by María Ostiz. Organised by the Organización de Televisión Iberoamericana (OTI) and host broadcaster Televisión Española (TVE), the contest was held at the Centro Cultural de la Villa de Madrid on Saturday 12 November 1977 and was hosted by Mari Cruz Soriano and Miguel de los Santos.

In this edition of the contest the number of participating countries experienced a new record of 21 competing entries selected by their participating broadcaster. The winner was the Nicaraguan entrant Eduardo Gonzalez (also known as Guayo Gonzalez) with his song "Quincho Barrilete" (Quincho, the boy of the little barrel), known for the social content of the lyrics.

Background 
According to the original rules of the OTI Festival, the winning country of the previous year would organise the contest of the following year. In this case Spain, with their broadcaster RTVE and their performer María Ostiz, were the winners of the previous year's edition of the event with the song "Canta cigarra" (Sing, Cicada).

As the host country, the broadcaster RTVE was going to be the organiser of this year's edition, for that reason the top member of the corporation arranged a meeting in order to decide the day, the city and the venue where the contest would be held.

As in the inaugural edition Madrid was announced as the host city due to its notable infrastructure and experience to host international expositions and also because of the growing reputation of the Spanish capital as a tourist hub.

This edition of the festival was notable for taking place in the newly democratic Spain led by Adolfo Suarez. RTVE used this edition of the contest in order to exhibit the changes of the new era.

Venue 

Unlike the inaugural edition, when the contest was held in the Congress Palace of Madrid, this sixth edition of the contest was held in The Cultural Centre of the Ville of Madrid. This theatre is located under the Jardines del Descubrimiento park in the centre of Madrid. The construction of this building started in 1973 and was finished in May 1977 few months before the OTI Festival was held again in this city.

Since this cultural centre was opened, it has hosted expositions of various nature, from music performances to art exhibitions, all of which are mainly related to the Latin American culture. The main hall of the cultural centre, where this edition of the festival was held, was renamed in 2007 as Teatro Fernán Gómez as an homage to the deceased popular actor Fernando Fernán Gómez.

The stage of this sixth show of the OTI Festival had a triangular shape and a light blue color with some metallic elements on top and the logo of OTI in one of the corners. As usual, this stage was divided in two parts, the orchestral one and the central one, where the competing singers and bands gave their performances.

Participating countries 
The number of participating countries reached a new record of 21 delegations from different Latin American countries breaking the previous record that was reached in Acapulco in the edition of 1974.

As happened in the previous editions, both the state financed (for example RTVE) and the privately funded TV and Radio stations that were members of OTI (Iberoamerican Television Organisation) participated in the event sending their performers and competing song.

As usual some of the participating countries such as Mexico, Guatemala and Chile selected their entrants through live-broadcast national finals in order to select their participants. Other broadcasters with more or less resources, between them the host broadcaster of this year, RTVE, decided to select their entrant and song internally.

It must be taken into account that all the Central American countries participated in this year's edition. In fact, Honduras, one of the less-favoured participating countries, which had withdrawn in 1976, returned to the event and their national broadcaster selected their representing artist and song.

Another interesting fact is the return of Portugal. RTP, the Portuguese national broadcaster also sent a delegation to the capital city of the neighbouring country with a well known representative.

Participating performers 

It must be taken into account the participation of the Argentine performer Jerónimo who was a well known performer in his country and who had won previously the Benidorm Song Contest also in Spain. The song which with he competed in the OTI Festival had the title of "Jugar a vivir" (To play to live).

The representatives of Spain, the host country were the popular band Trigo Limpio with their hit song "Rómpeme mátame" (Tear me apart and kill me). Three years later the same band would represent their country in the Eurovision Song Contest in 1980. Amaya Saizar, who was then the female vocalist of Trigo Limpio would also participate in the Eurovision Song Contest in 1984 as the female member of the band Bravo.

The Cuban singer Lissette, competed in the festival representing the United States of America with her song "Eclipse total de amor (Total eclipse of love). 

The Portuguese entrant was the well known Paulo de Carvalho, who was internally selected by RTP, the Portuguese broadcaster as the representative of that country with the song "Amor sem palavras" (Love without words). This singer is also known for his participation in the Eurovision song Contest in 1974.

The Peruvian entry entitled "Lando" was performed by Cecilia Bracamonte and composed by the popular singer-songwriter Chabuca Granda. This song is known for its fusion of Andean and Caribbean rhythms.

The Mexican representative, as usual, was selected in the Mexican National OTI Contest, the successful national final that Televisa, the Mexican national broadcaster, used to produce every year, but this time, the election of José María Napoleón was controversial. When his selection was announced, the viewers in the auditorium booed the performer when he took the stage as the NF winner. This controversy would later undermine his entry.

Guayo González, the Nicaraguan contestant, sang "Quincho Barrilete", a song addressing poverty, composed by the renowned Carlos Mejía Godoy. The song won the national final despite the dictatorship of the Anastasio Somoza Debayle.

Conductors 
Each performance had a conductor who led the orchestral accompaniment.

 Rafael Ibarbia
  Elcio Alvarez
  Guicion Torres Jr.
  Julio Franic
  Rafael Ibarbia
  Júan Carlos Calderon
  Jonathan Zarsorca
  Rafael Ibarbia
  Frank Dione
  Claudio Sarin
  Javier Iburrante
 Cholo Ortiz
  Manuel Cortas
  
  Rafael Ibarbia
  Trillo Rodrigúez
  Rafael Ibarbia
  
  Pancho Saenz
  Jonathan Zarsorca
 Rafael Ibarbia

Presenters 
The well known news journalists Mari Cruz Soriano and Miguel de los Santos were the master and mistress of ceremonies of this edition of the OTI Festival.

The presenters after the opening act, performed by the philharmonic orchestra of TVE gave their usual introductory speech in Spanish and Portuguese languages in which they highlighted the main goals of the OTI organisation as a media group and the OTI Festival as a song competition.

When the performance round started, as usual the presenters made brief individual presentations of the participating performers and entries.

Running order 
As happened from the inaugural edition, the host broadcaster, in this RTVE in collaboration with the Iberoamerican Television Organisation (OTI) organised a draw in Madrid few days before the event took place.

The performance round was opened by the entrant from the Netherlands Antilles with his love song "Gente eres tu" (You are people) with received a mainly cold welcome by the followers of the festival.

The host entrants the popular Spanish band Trigo Limpio were the sixth ones to take the stage receiving, before and after, a warm welcome by the fans and later by the juries.

The Mexican performer Jose María Napoleón was the seventh one to take the stage. This entry suffered from the start a cold welcome due to the scandal that created his unexpected victory in the national final.

The entries from the United States and the Dominican Republic were the eighth and ninth ones to take the stage respectively. Both songs received a warm welcome by the juries.

The successful Nicaraguan entrant Guayo Gonzalez and his song "Quincho Barrilete" was the thirtieth one to take the stage and was received with high interest due to the deep message.

This year unlike the previous one, both Portugal and Brazil sent their entries in Portuguese language, although the last lines of the Brazilian entry were performed in Spanish, making it the first and only bilingual song of the history of the contest.

The performance round was ended by the entry from El Salvador entitled "Enséñame a vivir" (Teach me how to live) which was performed by Ana Marcela D'Antonio.

Voting system 
The voting system followed the same process of the previous years in which the national juries were contacted by telephone by the presenters. Unlike in previous editions, and due to the growing number of participating countries and the resulting greater length of the show, the participating broadcasters agreed to reduce the number of national jurors per country from five to three. Each juror only indicate his or her favourite song among the participating entries.

The national juries of every participating country were contacted directly by telephone by the presenters from the Ruiz de Alarcón Theatre in Acapulco in order to know the decision of the jurors.

Technical issues 
Although the broadcast of the show to Latin America went properly, during the voting process RTVE had problems to contact the jurors of some of the participating countries. As a result, some countries which needed to vote in the participation order were contacted after the rest of the participating countries gave their votes. Although the technical issues were later solved, those issues generated controversy in the Green Room and in the auditorium.

Voting process 
The voting process was tense, but the length of it was much shorter due to the reduction in the number of national jurors. That contributed to the fact that the winner was known in a record space of time. Shortly after the start of the voting process, United States led the scoreboard, far ahead of performers from the Dominican Republic, Nicaragua and Spain, the other four performers that reached the podium.

Result 
The contest was won by the Nicaraguan entrant Eduardo Gonzalez with his song Quincho Barrilete. The song won the festival with a huge lead in points over his Dominican, American and Spanish counterparts which, although warmly received by the jurors and the audience, were not able to win the full attention of the juries.

The Dominican and American performers, Lissette Alvarez and Fernándo Casado were tied for second position with eight points while the Spanish band Trigo Limpio placed fourth with seven points.

In contrast with previous years, five countries tied for last place, having no points. The Brazilian entrant Lolita Rodrigues and her counterparts from Honduras, México, Guatemala and Costa Rica were heavily criticised and didn't receive points from the juries.

Audience and impact 
This sixth edition of the festival not only broke the record of participating countries with 21 delegations, but also reached a record of audience with a striking viewing figures of three hundred million viewers. One hundred million more than the previous edition. Due to these two reasons the festival was considered a success for TVE. The same broadcaster, one day after the festival, broadcast a special program about this edition of the OTI Festival.

The Nicaraguan victory in the contest, its first and only victory, and also the only victory of a Central American country in the event, turned into a hit in Nicaragua and its success affected both the performer Eduardo Gonzalez and the song's writer Carlos Mejía Godoy. The lyrics of the song were also regarded as highly representative of the serious problems in Latin American society such as poverty. The song tells the history of a boy known as "Quincho Barrilete" (Quincho, the boy of the little barrel) a poor boy, who tries to earn a living honestly and to save money so that his younger brothers could go to the school in the future. A part of the chorus says "Long live the young people of my homeland who are a clear example of poverty and dignity. Due to the moving history that the lyrics told, the singer and the author are widely remembered in Nicaragua.

The song "Rómpeme Mátame" by the Spanish band Trigo Limpio, who were the host entrants, also became a hit in Spain and Latin America. Although the lyrics of the song were controversial because of describing a tortuous and possessive relationship, the fourth place that the band got, consolidated their career in the Latin sphere and also paved their selection for the Eurovision Song Contest three years later.

The Ecuadorian performer Marielisa also performed a song with a social background which was considered to be a response to the winning song of the festival in 1974 in Acapulco. While the message of the song of Nydia Car states that songs don't improve the problems of the Latin American society, Marielisa's song which ended fifth in the contest, states that those same problems must not be ignored.

Despite the shocking and unexpected last place of Mexico, partly due to the scandal that the victory of José María Napoleon provoked, his song "Hombre" (Man) became a hit and launched his career and he is now considered a superstar.

See also 
 Eurovision Song Contest 1974
 Eurovision Song Contest 1977
 OTI Festival 1972
 OTI Festival 1974

References

External links 
 Organización de Telecomunicaciones de Iberoamerica website
 OTI Festival blog

OTI Festival by year
1977 in Latin music
1977 in Spain
Music festivals in Spain